Desanka "Beba" Lončar (Serbian Cyrillic: Десанка „Беба“ Лончар; born 28 April 1943) is a former Yugoslav film actress. She appeared in 52 films between 1960 and 1982. She was born in Belgrade, Serbia. Known for her film career during the 1960s and 1970s, she first became a star in native Yugoslavia before moving to Italy where she achieved considerable success.

Early life
Growing up in the Belgrade neighbourhood of Dorćol, Lončar got involved with performing at an early age. During the late 1950s she was given on-camera speaking bits in kids' and youth programmes on the recently launched TV Belgrade. She studied acting under tutelage of director Soja Jovanović who gave Lončar her film debut — an uncredited bit part in 1960's .

Career

Debut
Lončar's acting break came with getting cast alongside another pair of first-time film performers—twenty-year-old Boris Dvornik and fifteen-year-old Dušica Žegarac—in France Štiglic's Deveti krug, a Holocaust story produced by Jadran Film about a Jewish family from Zagreb that would go on to achieve notable critical success.

Before Deveti krug was even released, sixteen-year-old Lončar landed her first lead role—the part of a beautiful young girl Sonja Ilić in the teenage comedy  produced by Avala Film.

Early career in Yugoslavia
Deveti krug premiered in late April 1960 to good reviews. Although the lead role of Ruth Alkalaj went to another teenage up-an-coming actress—Dušica Žegarac—Lončar's portrayal of Magda also received very positive notices. The film got selected for competition at the 1960 Cannes Film Festival during May with Lončar and Žegarac, both still high school students, getting their first taste of glitz and glamour as they made the rounds at the festival. Several months later in August, the film won the Golden Arena award at the 1960 Pula Film Festival in addition to becoming Yugoslav official submission for the best foreign movie and actually getting nominated for the Best Foreign Language Film at the 33rd Academy Awards.

Later that fall Ljubav i moda (Love and Fashion) came out, creating a sensation the likes of which hadn't been seen in the country to date. Teenage Lončar had her voice dubbed in the movie by the twenty-nine-year-old actress . Backed by a pop music soundtrack that achieved its own popularity on the strength of the "Devojko mala" track sung by Đuza Stojiljković, the cheeky picture became a commercial smash hit in communist Yugoslavia. Carrying the breezy comedy alongside  as well as established stars of Yugoslav cinema Miodrag Petrović Čkalja and Mija Aleksić, Lončar's beauty and charm left an impression on the general audiences that paved the way for her movie career.

With only two films under her belt, by the end of 1960, seventeen-year-old Lončar's cinematic profile was raised beyond all expectations. She next got cast as the female lead in Aleksandar Petrović's directorial debut—Avala Film-produced romantic drama Dvoje—alongside Miha Baloh and Miloš Žutić. Playing the role of mysteriously flirtatious Belgrade girl Jovana Zrnić, she once again got plenty of positive reactions in the press. The movie got released in late July 1961, and the following year got selected for the competition programme at Cannes. Although it ended up not quite matching the success of Deveti krug on the festival circuit, Dvoje got very good reviews for its innovative approach as a breath of fresh air in the Yugoslav cinema that up to that point had mostly been making genre films of very specific and rigid structure and narrative. The movie also marked the first time Lončar was officially billed using her nickname "Beba" rather than her given first name, a practice that would be continued for the remainder of her career.

Already a bona fide film star in Yugoslavia as well as a nationwide sex symbol, Lončar started getting parts in Avala Film co-productions with foreign production companies being shot in Yugoslavia. Franz Antel cast her in the supporting role of Afra in the Austrian movie , marking the first time she took part in a foreign film. Following a few more Yugoslav movies where she had notable roles—Soja Jovanović's comedy  based on Branislav Nušić's eponymous novel and 's —Lončar took a supporting part in the high-budget British-Yugoslav over-the-top adventure co-production The Long Ships directed by Jack Cardiff and starring Richard Widmark, Sidney Poitier, Russ Tamblyn and Rosanna Schiaffino, that was entirely shot in Yugoslavia. She reportedly got the role of Gerda after another actress that had already been cast for the role abruptly left the set. Forced to scramble, Cardiff looked for a local replacement and ended up casting blonde Lončar whose physical features fit the requirements of the Viking woman role. 

Another foreign production in Yugoslavia Lončar took part in was the West German-funded musical western Freddy in the Wild West, directed by Sobey Martin, with the young actress in the female lead role opposite Austrian singer-actor Freddy Quinn.

Italian period

Lončar's career in the Italian cinema began in 1964 when she got cast by Mauro Bolognini for his segment within , a three-segment film. At only twenty-one years of age she moved to Rome and continued acting in Italian films.

The year 1965 was a breakout one for Lončar in Italy as she appeared in six films. In early spring, Carlo Lizzani's La Celestina P... R... premiered where she had a sizable role followed by a bit part in Gérard Oury's Le Corniaud and a bigger one in Steno's Letti sbagliati. The late summer saw her in Mario Monicelli's Casanova 70 playing one of Marcello Mastroianni's many love interests in the film followed by Luciano Salce's Slalom where Lončar and Daniela Bianchi appeared as tandem of temptresses weaving their web around the duo of pals, both of whom are married, played by Vittorio Gassman and Adolfo Celi. She rounded the year off with Massimo Franciosa's Il morbidone alongside Paolo Ferrari, Anouk Aimée, Sylva Koscina, and Margaret Lee.

Her early roles in Italy revealed a theme that would continue throughout her career in the country as Italian directors and producers generally cast her in roles of exotic and mysterious seductresses within the commedia all'italiana genre.

Partial filmography

 The Ninth Circle (1960) - Magda
 The Love and the Fashion (1960) - Sonja Ilic
 And Love Has Vanished (1961) - Jovana Zrnic
 Medaljon sa tri srca (1962) - (segment "Prica2")
 Dr (1962) - Slavka Cvijovic
 ...und ewig knallen die Räuber (1962) - Afra
 Zemljaci (1963) - Jana
 The Long Ships (1964) - Gerda
 Ein Frauenarzt klagt an (1964) - Eva Möllmer
 Lito vilovito (1964) - May
 Freddy in the Wild West (1964) - Deputy Sheriff Anita Daniels
 La donna è una cosa meravigliosa (1964) - (segment "Una donna dolce, dolce")
 La Celestina P... R... (1965) - Luisella
 Le Corniaud (1965) - Ursula - la naturiste
 Letti sbagliati (1965) - Enrichetta Cordelli (segment "Quel porco di Maurizio")
 Casanova 70 (1965) - La ragazza del museo
 Slalom (1965) - Helen
 The Dreamer (1965) - Laura
 The Birds, the Bees and the Italians (1966) - Noemi Castellan
 The Boy Who Cried Murder (1966) - Susie
 In the Shadow of the Eagles (1966) - Helen
 Bitter Fruit (1967) - Tita
 Lucky, the Inscrutable (1967) - Beba
 Days of Violence (1967) - Christine Evans
 Soledad (1967)
 Massacre in the Black Forest (1967) - Livia
 Cover Girl (1968) - Anna
 The Fuller Report (1968) - Svetlana Golyadkin
 Frame Up (1968) - Janet
 Listen, Let's Make Love (1968) - Aunt Lidia
 Some Girls Do (1969) - Pandora
 Cuore di mamma (1969) - Magda Franti - Andrea's sister
 Sharon vestida de rojo (1969) - Sharon Adams
 Interrabang (1969) - Anna
 Pussycat, Pussycat, I Love You (1970) - Ornella
 Cerca di capirmi (1970) - Lz Sher
 Brancaleone at the Crusades (1970) - Berta d'Avignone
 Who Killed the Prosecutor and Why? (1972) - Olga
 Decameron's Jolly Kittens (1972) - Madonna Lydia (segment "The Magic Pear Tree")
 La ragazza dalla pelle di luna (1974) - Helen
 Ho incontrato un'ombra TV drama (1974) - Silvia Predal
 Percy is Killed (1976)
 Special Squad Shoots on Sight (1976) - Jane
 La donneuse (1976) - Françoise
 Quelle strane occasioni (1976) - Vedova Adami (segment "L'Ascensore")
 Ragazzo di borgata (1976)
 Gli uccisori (1977)
 Quella strana voglia d'amare (1977) - Claudia / teacher
 The Pals (1979) - Drugarica Tanja
 Drugarcine (1979) - Vera Djuric
 Sunday Lovers (1980) - Marisa (segment "Armando's Notebook")
 Don't Look in the Attic (1982) (aka The House of the Cursed Spirits, aka La villa delle anime maladette, aka House of the Damned, aka Evil Touch) - Martha

Personal life
Lončar was married to Croatian businessman and socialite Josip "Dikan" Radeljak. The two met in Split during the 1970s and had a son Leo in 1982. After giving birth for the first time at the age of 39, Lončar decided to end her film career. Towards the late 1980s, the couple separated as Radeljak left Lončar for the younger actress Ena Begović. Following a bitter court battle, their divorce was finalized in 1994 with Radeljak getting the custody of their only son.

During summer 2000, Lončar started living with Serbian skier Stevan Marinković Knićanin whom she eventually married. In late 2000, she moved from Rome back to her hometown Belgrade where she's been living ever since. Despite not acting for almost 30 years, Lončar is still very much in demand by the Serbian and former Yugoslav media. However, she leads a very quiet, low-key life and rarely makes media appearances. Her latest one was for the 50th anniversary of the release of Ljubav i moda during June 2010.

References

External links

1943 births
Living people
Actresses from Belgrade
Italian film actresses
Serbian film actresses
Serbian child actresses
Yugoslav film actresses
Yugoslav child actresses
20th-century Italian actresses
20th-century Serbian actresses